Blood of the Beast is a 2003 American experimental horror film written, and directed by Georg Koszulinski, who also stars in the film.  It focuses on a post-apocalyptic society that depends on cloning is overrun by a generation of faulty, homicidal clones.

Plot 
Billions of people are killed in World War III, and most of the surviving males are rendered sterile.  As a result, humanity resorts to cloning as its primary form of reproduction.  All goes well until the first generation of clones turn nineteen and degenerate into bestial killers.  The military attempts to contain the threat, but they are unsuccessful.  Three groups of survivors who have fled into rural Florida  are besieged by the killer clones.  Ultimately, Jesse is the last to survive, and the film ends as he is surrounded.

Cast 
 Georg Koszulinski as Jesse
 Matt Devine as James
 Sharon Chudnow as Alice
 Joshua Breit as Stevie
 Natalie Sullivan as Julie
 Markeia McCarty as Keia
 Derrick Aguis as the Hiker
 Brian Tamm as John
 Carol Zarzecki as Mae
 Charles Norton as Reverend

Production 
Blood of the Beast was shot in Gainesville, Florida.  Director Koszulinski was inspired by the French documentaries Blood of the Beasts and Night and Fog, and he used footage from Hiroshima mon amour.  Other influences include Nineteen Eighty-Four, Brave New World, Nosferatu, Night of the Living Dead, and I Am Legend.  Koszulinski cast himself as the lead when he could not find anyone else willing to commit.

Release 
Koszulinski submitted Blood of the Beast to festivals that he knew would not discriminate against its experimental structure.  The theatrical premiere was on September 15, 2003, in Gainesville, Florida.

Home media
The film was released on DVD by Alpha Video on June 22, 2004.

Reception 

Eric Campos of Film Threat rated it 3/5 stars and called it a memorable and smart film that is reminiscent of 28 Days Later but with a fraction of the budget.  Kyle Mitchell of The Gainesville Sun wrote, "The classic moral and functional questions of cloning dance quietly beside horror and gore for a truly mind-twisting mix."  HorrorNews.Net wrote that the film is too confusing and experimental to enjoy.  In The Encyclopedia of Zombie Films, Volume 2, academic Peter Dendle wrote that the film "pretends to be a meditation on technology-gone-awry in a dystopic future but winds up being more of a meditation on pretentiousness."

Awards 
Koszulinski won Best Horror Director at the Rhode Island International Horror Film Festival and Best Emerging Talent at the Dahlonega International Film Festival.

References

Further reading

External links 
 
 
 

2003 films
2003 horror films
2000s avant-garde and experimental films
2003 independent films
2000s science fiction horror films
American avant-garde and experimental films
American independent films
American science fiction horror films
Films about cloning
American post-apocalyptic films
American zombie films
Films set in Florida
Films shot in Florida
2000s English-language films
2000s American films